"Yearning for Your Love" is a 1980 ballad recorded and released by The Gap Band on Mercury Records. The single was the third release off the band's fifth album, The Gap Band III (1980). Four different singles, each with a different B-side, were released in 1981.

The song became a modest hit on the US and UK charts when it was released; it arose to number five on the Hot Soul Singles chart and number sixty on the Billboard Hot 100. Written by Gap Band backing member/keyboardist Oliver Scott and keyboardist Ronnie Wilson, it was a romantic love song dedicated to Wilson's wife at the time and was performed by Ronnie's brother Charlie Wilson.

Structure
The song was markedly different in style from the past few hits, with less emphasis on synthesizers, instead on "light slices of guitar, smooth keyboard pads and soft percussion". It is said, Charlie Wilson's smooth baritone take on the song helped the song become influential to contemporary R&B singers, such as Keith Sweat, Johnny Gill and Gerald Levert.

Charts

Track listing

Releases
Yearning For Your Love/Burn Rubber
Yearning For Your Love/Humpin'
Yearning For Your Love/When I Look In Your Eyes 
Yearning for Your Love/Oops Upside Your Head

Credits
Lead vocals by Charlie Wilson
Background vocals by Oliver Scott, Ronnie Wilson and Robert Wilson
Drums by Ronnie Kaufman
Guitars by Fred Jenkins, Glenn Nightingale
Bass by Robert Wilson
Synthesizers by Ronnie Wilson
Keyboards by Oliver Scott

Cover versions
In 1989, French pianist Alex Bugnon covered the song for his album, Love Season.

In 1990, Guy also covered the song on their 1990 album, The Future.

In 2001, keyboardist Kevin Toney covered the song on his album Strut. The song featured Evelyn "Champagne" King on vocals.

In 2019, singer PJ Morton covered the song from his album Paul.

Sampling
The song has been sampled several times including some of the following:
"Gank Move" by Big Mello (1992)
"Always On My Mind" by SWV (1993)
"Life's a Bitch" by Nas feat. AZ and Olu Dara (1994)
"Outta My Life" by Paris (1994)
"My Woman" by Coop MC (1995)
"Sacramento Summertime" by Gangsta Dre (1996)
"Keep Hustlin" by WC feat. E-40 and Too Short (1998)
"Pad & Pen" by A Tribe Called Quest (1998)
"Keep It Comin'" by Heavy D (1997)
"Watcha Wanna Do" by Mia X feat. Charlie Wilson (1998)
"It's Going Down by Parle (2000)
"I-95" by Styles P feat. Tre Williams (2007)
"Touch My Body" by Mariah Carey (2007)
"Love Like This" by Natasha Bedingfield feat. Sean Kingston (2008)
"Lifes a Bitch" by Elzhi feat. Royce da 5'9 & Stokley Williams (2011)
"Real" by Common feat. Elijah Blake (2014)
"Yernin" by Sevyn Streeter (2018)
"Only God Knows" by D-Flexx (1997)

References

1980 songs
1981 singles
The Gap Band songs
Funk ballads
MCA Records singles
Rhythm and blues ballads
1980s ballads